Soft Talk is the third studio album by American singer-songwriter Shelby Lynne. It was released in 1991 on the Epic label. Two tracks on the album, "The Very First Lasting Love" and "Stop Me" were performed with Les Taylor. The album reached No. 55 on the Billboard Country Albums chart. AllMusic's Bil Carpenter gave Soft Talk a star rating of three out of five and described it as "defiant, emotionally draining country." People considered the album "more subdued" but a "pleasing package".

Track listing
"Don't Cross Your Heart" (Tony Haselden, Tim Mensy) — 2:55
"I've Learned to Live" (Dean Dillon, Frank Dycus) — 3:52
"Alive and Well" (Michael Garvin, Bucky Jones) — 3:21
"A Lighter Shade of Blue" (Max D. Barnes, Skip Ewing, Troy Seals) — 3:47
"It Must Be You" (Hugh Prestwood) — 3:07
"You Can't Break a Broken Heart" (Chuck Jones, Chris Waters) — 3:14
"Soft Talk" (Seals, Eddie Setser) — 3:39
"The Very First Lasting Love" (Paul Hollowell, Les Taylor, Lonnie Wilson) — 3:34
"Stop Me" (Jim Lauderdale, John Leventhal) — 3:43
"It Might Be Me" (C. Jones, J. D. Martin) — 4:22

Personnel

Music
Sonny Garrish – dobro, steel guitar
Steve Gibson – electric guitar
Chuck Jones – acoustic guitar
Mike Lawler – organ, synthesizer
Paul Leim – drums
Shelby Lynne – lead vocals, background vocals 
Brent Mason – acoustic guitar
Mickey Raphael – harmonica
Gary W. Smith – piano, keyboards
Les Taylor – duet vocals on "Stop Me"
Glenn Worf – bass guitar

Production
Milan Bogdan – digital editing
Rodney Good – assistant engineer
Julian King – assistant engineer
John Kunz – mixing assistant
Glenn Meadows – mastering
Lynn Peterzell – engineer, mixing
Design
Bill Johnson – art direction
Ron Keith – photography
Rollow Welch – design

Chart performance

References

1991 albums
Epic Records albums
Shelby Lynne albums
Albums produced by James Stroud